Cynosure (from Greek Κυνοσούρα kunosoura "dog's tail") may refer to:
Polaris, in its role as pole star
metaphorically:
a guiding principle
a focus of attention
Cynosura (nymph), nymph in Greek mythology
Cynosure (comics), fictional pan-dimensional city that exists within the First Comics multiverse
Cynosure (album), an album by progressive/power metal band Viathyn